Olle Forsell Schefvert (born 13 August 1993) is a Swedish handball player for Rhein-Neckar Löwen and the Swedish national team.

He was part of the Swedish squad that won gold medal at the 2013 Junior World Championship. He represented Sweden at the 2023 World Championship.

References

1993 births
Living people
Swedish male handball players
Sportspeople from Halmstad
IK Sävehof players
HSG Wetzlar players
Rhein-Neckar Löwen players
Expatriate handball players
Swedish expatriate sportspeople in Germany
Handball-Bundesliga players